Blue Mountain, Blue Mountain Ridge, or the Blue Mountains of Pennsylvania, is a ridge of the Appalachian Mountains in eastern Pennsylvania. Forming the southern and eastern edge of the Ridge-and-Valley Appalachians physiographic province in Pennsylvania, Blue Mountain extends  from the Delaware Water Gap on the New Jersey border in the east to Big Gap in Franklin County in south-central Pennsylvania at its southwestern end.

Views of Blue Mountain dominate the southern tier of most eastern and central Pennsylvanian counties, providing an ever-visible backdrop cutting across the northern or western horizon. Most transport corridors and road beds piercing the barrier necessarily pass through either large water gaps (west to east: the Susquehanna, Schuylkill, Lehigh and Delaware River valleys) or wind gaps, low gaps in the ridge caused by ancient watercourses. The barrier ridge forms a distinct boundary between a number of Pennsylvania's geographical and cultural regions.

To the south of the Susquehanna River gap in the south-central part of the state is the Cumberland Valley, part of the Great Appalachian Valley; to its northwest side are the southern reaches of the Susquehanna Valley with picturesque streams channeling travel corridors deep into and over the central and western mountains and valleys—the heartland interior counties of Pennsylvania; along the Main Branch Susquehanna, the valleys also lead into the Coal Region of northeast Pennsylvania, the Wyoming Valley, and the distant Poconos. To the south of Blue Mountain lies the Capital Region of Harrisburg and nearby communities, the rich farming country of the Lebanon Valley and Pennsylvania Dutch Country of York and Lancaster counties, the lower half of the Lehigh Valley, and the lower Delaware Valley; the latter two extend north through water gaps beyond the ridgeline.

Geography

The southwestern end of the mountain is at Big Gap, west of Shippensburg. The mountain ridge continues to the southwest toward Maryland as Broad Mountain. The northeastern end of the mountain is at the Delaware Water Gap on the New Jersey border. Mount Minsi, elevation , forms the promontory overlooking the Delaware River. The ridge of Blue Mountain continues northeast into New Jersey as Kittatinny Mountain.

Blue Mountain marks the boundary between the Great Appalachian Valley and the main Ridge-and-Valley Appalachians.

Water gaps
Four of Pennsylvania's major rivers cut through Blue Mountain in water gaps:
 The Delaware River, which forms Pennsylvania's eastern border with New Jersey, passes through the ridge just southeast of Stroudsburg.
 The Lehigh River, which feeds the Delaware at Easton, passes through the Lehigh Gap at the ridge near Palmerton.
 The Schuylkill River, which feeds the Delaware at Philadelphia, passes through the ridge just north of Hamburg.
 The Susquehanna River, which feeds the Chesapeake Bay, passes through the ridge just north of Harrisburg, Pennsylvania's capital.

Pennsylvania Turnpike

The Pennsylvania Turnpike system passes through Blue Mountain at two points:
 The Blue Mountain Tunnel carries the turnpike's east–west mainline (Interstate 76) through the ridge in northern Franklin County.
 The Lehigh Tunnel carries the turnpike's north–south Northeast Extension (Interstate 476) through the ridge between Lehigh and Carbon. Both tunnels consist of two tubes and carry two lanes in each direction of travel.

Blue Mountain attractions in Pennsylvania
 The Appalachian Trail is concurrent with the top of the ridge from New Jersey to northern Lebanon County.
 Hawk Mountain Sanctuary is located at the very northern edge of Berks County.
 Hawk Mountain Ranger School, located just south of the Sanctuary, trains Civil Air Patrol members for their ground search and rescue Ranger Teams.
 Blue Mountain Resort is found on the north face of the ridge in the southeastern corner of Carbon County.
 Delaware Water Gap National Recreation Area reaches across Northampton, Monroe, and Pike counties and into New Jersey, mostly to the northwest of the ridge.
 Boyd Big Tree Preserve Conservation Area is located in Dauphin County

Blue Mountain School District is named after the mountain range. It is located just off Route 61 in Schuylkill Haven, Pennsylvania.

See also
 Blue Mountain Geology

References

External links

 Blue Mountain Ski Area
 Blue Mountain School District

Ridges of Pennsylvania
Landforms of Berks County, Pennsylvania
Landforms of Dauphin County, Pennsylvania
Landforms of Franklin County, Pennsylvania
Landforms of Monroe County, Pennsylvania
Mountains of Lehigh County, Pennsylvania
Ridges of Carbon County, Pennsylvania